The 1969–70 Tercera División season is the 36th since its establishment.

Group 1

Group 2

Group 3

Group 4

Group 5

Group 6

Group 7

Group 8

Playoffs

Promotion to Segunda División

Match of Tiebreaker:

Promotion to Segunda: Langreo, Logroñés, Cádiz and Moscardó
Qualified to promotion/relegation playoff: Villarreal, Hércules, Santander and Tarrasa

Promotion/relegation

Match of Tiebreaker:

 

 Permanence in Segunda: Burgos
 Promotion to Segunda: Hércules, Villarreal and Santander
 Relegation to Tercera: Osasuna, Bilbao At. and Ilicitano

External links
RSSSF 
Futbolme 

Tercera División seasons
3
Spain